Jonathan A. Harris (born 1964) is an American politician. Harris, a Democrat, is the former Commissioner of the Connecticut Department of Consumer Protection.  He served as a state senator from Connecticut's Fifth District from 2005 to 2011.

Early life
Harris grew up in West Hartford and graduated from Hall High School and later from Brandeis University. He worked for U.S. Congressman Barbara Kennelly before earning a Juris Doctor degree from New York University School of Law.

Political career

Harris, a resident of West Hartford, represented Bloomfield (part), Burlington, Farmington (part), and West Hartford in the Connecticut Senate. Prior to being elected to the Senate, he served as mayor of West Hartford.

On April 1, 2010, Harris formally entered the race for Connecticut Secretary of the State. He was endorsed by U.S. Rep. John B. Larson (D-CT) and West Hartford mayor Scott Slifka. Harris narrowly missed receiving the Democratic Party's nomination at the state convention. He withdrew from the race on June 7, 2010.

In March 2011, Harris was appointed Deputy Treasurer of the State of Connecticut. He served until May 2012. On May 11, 2012, State Party Chair Nancy Dinardo announced that Harris would succeed Eric Hyers as the Executive Director of the Connecticut Democratic State Central Committee. In December 2014, Harris was nominated to succeed William M. Rubenstein as the Commissioner of the Department of Consumer Protection. He served as commissioner from 2015 to 2017.

On February 24, 2018, Harris officially announced his run for governor of Connecticut. Prior to that date, he had been exploring a run for statewide office. As of January 1, 2018, Harris had raised $232,745. Harris dropped out of the race on April 27, 2018 and endorsed Ned Lamont. Harris joined the Lamont administration as the undersecretary of comprehensive planning and intergovernmental policy at the Office of Policy and Management. In July 2019, he was promoted to senior adviser to Gov. Lamont.

Electoral history

Personal life
Harris is married to Lucy B. Harris.

References

1964 births
Living people
People from West Hartford, Connecticut
Brandeis University alumni
New York University School of Law alumni
Democratic Party Connecticut state senators
Mayors of places in Connecticut
Hall High School (Connecticut) alumni